The Taipei Metro Zhongshan Elementary School station is a station on the Xinzhuang Line located in Zhongshan, Taipei, Taiwan. The station opened for service on 3 November 2010.

This station was named after the Zhongshan Elementary School, but it is notable that the Taiwan Institute of Economic Research is located nearby.

Station overview
This two-level, underground station has an island platform. It is located beneath the intersection of Minquan West Rd. and Linsen North Rd. and opened on 3 November 2010 with the opening of the Luzhou Branch Line and the Taipei City section of the Xinzhuang Line.

Construction
Excavation depth for this station is around 19 meters. It is 160 meters in length and 23 meters wide. It has four entrances, one accessible elevator, and two vent shafts. It is equipped with platform screen doors.

Station layout

Exits	
Exit 1: Linsen N. Rd.	
Exit 2: Xinxing Junior High School	
Exit 3: Xinsheng N. Rd.	
Exit 4: Zhongshan Elementary School

Around the station	
 Taiwan Institute of Economic Research	
 The Landis Taipei
 Zhongshan Elementary School	
 Xinxing Junior High School	
 Taipei Public Library, Heng-an People's Reading Room	
 Qingguang Shopping District	
 Hotel Sunroute Taipei (between this station and Minquan West Road Station)	
 Dao Jiang Senior High School of Nursing & Home Economics
 Shuangcheng Street Night Market

References

Zhonghe–Xinlu line stations
Railway stations opened in 2010